In Islam, the munafiqun ('hypocrites', singular  munāfiq) or false Muslims or false believers are a group decried in the Quran as outward Muslims who were inwardly concealing disbelief (“kufr”) and actively sought to undermine the Muslim community. Munafiq is a person who in public and in community shows that he is a Muslim but rejects Islam or propagates against it either in his heart or among the enemies of Islam. The hypocrisy itself is called nifāq.

Types of hypocrisy 
 Hypocrisy towards God regarding actual faith. (Q2:8) and (Q2:14)
 Hypocrisy towards the tenets of faith: for example, somebody may believe in God, Judgment Day, accounting, scales of deeds and Hellfire (with an uncertainty and doubt) but not fear them at all (in actual) or not refrain from committing sins because of them. Yet he claims, "I fear God".
 Hypocrisy towards the deeds: Not performing obligatory works properly.
 Hypocrisy towards others: somebody is double-faced and double-tongued. He praises someone in their presence, then, behind their back, he denounces them and tries to cause them pain and harm.
Hadith - Four signs of a pure hypocrite:

Abdullah ibn Amr reported: The Messenger of Allah, peace and blessings be upon him, said, “There are four signs that make someone a pure hypocrite and whoever has them has a characteristic of hypocrisy until he abandons it: (1) when he speaks he lies; (2) when he makes a covenant he is treacherous; (3) when he makes a promise he breaks it; and (4) when he argues he is wicked.”

Munafiqun in the Quran
The Quran has many verses discussing munāfiqūn, referring to them as more dangerous to Muslims than the worst non-Muslim enemies of Islam. 

In the Quran, the munafiqun are berated for their disloyalty towards the Muslims. They are described as seeking the subversion of Islam from within by dissembling a false allegiance. According to Surah 9:107-108 there was even a "mosque" of dissent that they built; this "mosque" was burned down by Muhammad.

The 63rd chapter (surah) of the Quran is titled Al-Munafiqun. The chapter deals with the phenomenon of hypocrisy; it criticizes hypocrisy and condemns the hypocrites; the treachery of the hypocrites of Medina is exposed and rebuked; Muhammad is warned to beware of trusting the hypocrites; the hypocrites are cursed and declared reprobates; the hypocrites are threatened with expulsion from Medina. In Surah Al-Nisa, verses 88-89 of the Quran, hypocrites are threatened with death.

Traits of the Munafiq according to Quran and Hadith
Hadith (record of the words, actions attributed to Muhammad) describe several traits of a hypocrite and these traits include both apparent actions and his/her inner iman/faith like the following:

 'Abd Allah ibn 'Amr ibn al-'As reported the Messenger of Allah as saying: Four characteristics constitute anyone who possesses them a sheer hypocrite (munafiq), and anyone who possesses one of them possesses a characteristics of hypocrisy till he abandons it: 
 when he talks he lies, 
 when he makes a promise he violates it, 
 when he makes a covenant he acts treacherously, and 
 when he quarrels/engages in a dispute, he explodes (فَجَرَ, ​​fajara) (abuses/deviates from the truth/behaves very imprudently, irrationally, foolishly, evilly and insultingly) 

 Narrated Abu Huraira: The Prophet said, "The signs of a munafiq are three:
 Whenever he speaks, he tells a lie. 
 Whenever he promises, he always breaks it (his promise). 
 If you trust him, he proves to be dishonest. (If you keep something as a trust with him, he will not return it.)" Another narration adds the words: "Even if he observes Saum (fasts), performs Salat (prayer) and claims to be a Muslim."

 Narrated Abdullah ibn Umar: Allah's Messenger said, "A believer eats in one intestine (is satisfied with a little food), and a kafir (unbeliever) or a munafiq eats in seven intestines (eats too much, or eats the food of 7 believing people – i.e – that which they are not entitled).

 Abu Hurairah narrated that The Messenger of Allah said:“He who dies without having gone or thought of going out for Jihad in the Cause of Allah, will die while being guilty of having one of the qualities of hypocrisy.” Related by Imam Muslim.

 Abu Umamah al Bahili narrated that the Messenger of Allah said: "Al-Haya'(modesty) and Al-'Iy(terse, brief & not talkative) are two branches of faith, and Al-Badha(vulgar) and Al-Bayan(very talkative) are two branches of Hypocrisy."

 It was narrated that Zirr said:Ali ibn Abi Talib said: "The Unlettered Prophet (Muhammad) made a covenant with me, that none but a believer would love me, and none but a munafiq would hate me."

 Narrated Anas bin Malik: The Prophet said, "Love for the Ansar is a sign of faith and hatred for the Ansar is a sign of hypocrisy."

 It was narrated from Ibn 'Umar that :The Messenger of Allah said: "The parable of the munafiq is that of a sheep that hesitates between two flocks, sometimes following one, and sometimes following another, not knowing which to follow."

 Abu Huraira reported Allah's Messenger as saying: The Similitude of a believer is that of (a standing) crop which the air continues to toss from one side to another; in the same way a believer always (receives the strokes) of misfortune. The similitude of a munafiq is that of a cypress tree which does not move until it is uprooted.

 It was narrated that the Prophet said: "Women who seek divorce and Khul' without just cause are like the female munafiq."

 Narrated Buraydah ibn al-Hasib: The Prophet  said: Do not call a Munafiq as sayyid (master), for if he is a sayyid, you will displease your Lord, Most High.

Salih Al Munajjid in his book Nifaq describes the nature and character of hypocrites as described in Quran and Hadith. These are:

Disordered mind
 Seduction of pleasure
Show of pride
Mocking with the verses of Allah
Jokes with the believers
Forbidding people to spend on the way of Allah
Maintaining harmony with unbelievers calling believers fools
Waiting for believers' result
Deception with Allah and laziness in worship
Tense and wavering attitude
Fooling the believers
Submitting lawsuits to apostate rulers
False oaths, fear, cowardice and restlessness
Create havoc among the believers
They thirst for praise in the name of doing what they did not do
They consider good deeds polluting
Happy at the lowest position
The order of injustice and the prohibition of justice
Disliking Jihad and turning away from it
Inciting not to fight and spreading scaremongering rumours
Unwillingness for being with the believers
Ask permission not to participate in Jihad
Excuses for holding back from Jihad
Trying to hide from people's eyes
Rejoicing at the loss of the believers
Betraying trusts, lying in conversation, breaking promises and using bad language in arguments.
Delaying Salat from its due time
Do not participate in Salaat Jama'a.
Ugly words and vulgarity
Listening to music

Remedy of Nifaq
Salih Al-Munajjid in his book Nifaq, as a remedy for Nifaq, says to do 10 things according to Quran and Sahih Hadith,
 Attending daily congregational prayers (Salat al-jama‘ah) with Takbeer Ula (known as Takbeer Tahrima) or First Takbeer for 40 consecutive days and attending in all the congregational prayers regularly

 Doing good deeds and gaining knowledge about religion
 Philanthropy
 Praying at night
 Jihad in the way of Allah
 Remembrance of Allah more and more (Dhikr)
 Dua
 Love for the Ansar
 Love for Ali Ibn Abi Talib

What Muslims should do with hypocrites
Salih Al Munajjid told Muslims to deal with hypocrites as follows according to the Quran and Sahih Hadith:
 Disobey them
 Ignoring, intimidating and admonishing the hypocrites
 Do not engage in debate with the hypocrites and do not favor them
 Do not make friends with hypocrites
 Waging jihad against the hypocrites and imposing austerity
 Show contempt for hypocrites and do not make them leaders
 Not participating in the funeral procession of the hypocrites

See also
 Abdullah ibn Ubayy
 Apostasy in Islam
 Dönmeh
 Kafir
 Kitman
 Sabbateans
 Shabakism
 Taqiya
 Zandaqa

References

Islamic terminology
Islam and other religions
Islamic belief and doctrine
Arabic words and phrases
Hypocrisy